The Consolidated B-24 Liberator was an American four-engine heavy bomber used by the United States Army Air Forces (USAAF) and other allied air forces during World War II. Of the 19,256 B-24, PB4Y-1, LB-30 and other model variants in the Liberator family produced, thirteen complete examples survive today, two of which are airworthy. Eight of the thirteen aircraft reside in the United States.

Post World War II
The B-24 was quickly declared obsolete by the USAAF and the remaining stateside aircraft were flown to desert storage in the US Southwest. In the Pacific theatre, many were simply parked, the oil drained from their engines and the aircraft left for reclamation by scrappers. The last flight of a B-24 in US military service was on 12 May 1959 when Strawberry Bitch left Bunker Hill Air Force Base (now Grissom Air Force Base), in Peru, Indiana following an Armed Forces Open House. It was bound for the National Museum of the U.S. Air Force at Wright-Patterson Air Force Base, where it is now displayed.

Lend-Lease
While at the end of the war both the British Royal Air Force and the Royal Australian Air Force were willing to continue operating the B-24, the terms of Lend-Lease agreements stipulated that these aircraft had to be either paid for or returned to the US, and vast graveyards of aircraft accumulated in India as well as Tarakan and Australia.

India
When India gained independence in 1947, 37 abandoned Liberators were refurbished for the Indian Air Force and served until their retirement in 1968. It is to this that six of the remaining thirteen B-24s owe their existence.

Surviving aircraft

Surviving aircraft by manufacturer

Surviving aircraft

Known wrecks

Notes

References

Consolidated B-24 Liberator
Consolidated B-24 Liberators
World War II bombers of the United States
Consolidated aircraft